Randy Garber is a member of the Kansas House of Representatives.

Biography
Garber was born on February 27, 1951, in Axtell, Kansas. He graduated from high school in Sabetha, Kansas. From 1969 to 1989, Garber served in the United States Navy. He and his wife, Kay, have five children between them.

Political career
Garber has been a member of the House of Representatives since 2011. He is a Republican. In 2019, Garber was lead sponsor of a bill that, in "an effort to stop human trafficking and pornography", aims to block online access to pornography, except for adults who have paid a fee. Also in 2019, Garber introduced House Bill 2273, which set minimum setbacks for commercial wind turbines. The bill also required that turbines be equipped with radar technology.

References

People from Marshall County, Kansas
People from Sabetha, Kansas
Military personnel from Kansas
Republican Party members of the Kansas House of Representatives
United States Navy sailors
1951 births
Living people
21st-century American politicians